The Frías II Cabinet constituted the 35th cabinet of the Republic of Bolivia. It was formed on 14 February 1874 after Tomás Frías was sworn in as the 17th president of Bolivia following the death of Adolfo Ballivián, succeeding the Ballivián Cabinet. It was dissolved on 4 May 1876 upon Frías' overthrow in a coup d'état and was succeeded by the Cabinet of Hilarión Daza.

Composition

History

Cabinet

References

Notes

Footnotes

Bibliography 

 

1874 establishments in Bolivia
1876 disestablishments in Bolivia
Cabinets of Bolivia
Cabinets established in 1874
Cabinets disestablished in 1876